The Adventures of Ben Gunn is a 1956 adventure novel by the British writer R.F. Delderfield. It is a prequel to Robert Louis Stevenson's Treasure Island.

In 1958 it was adapted into a BBC television series of the same title starring Peter Wyngarde and Rupert Davies.

References

Bibliography
Baskin, Ellen . Serials on British Television, 1950-1994. Scolar Press, 1996.
 Drew, Bernard A. Literary Afterlife: The Posthumous Continuations of 325 Authors' Fictional Characters. McFarland, 2010.

Works based on Treasure Island
1956 British novels
British historical novels
British adventure novels
Novels by R. F. Delderfield
British novels adapted into television shows
Hodder & Stoughton books
Prequel novels